Bethlehem Methodist Episcopal Church is a historic Methodist church located at Bethlehem, Taylor's Island, Dorchester County, Maryland. It was built in 1857, and is a gable-front common bond brick church across the road from a mid-19th century cemetery.

The Gothic Revival Victorian church has an octagonal belfry above which is an octagonal dome with a spire superimposed and covered in copper, making it look like an inverted ice cream cone.  It is the best example of a mid-19th century Methodist chapel in Dorchester County and retains its original interior.

It was listed on the National Register of Historic Places in 1979.

References

External links

, including photo from 1975, at Maryland Historical Trust

Churches on the National Register of Historic Places in Maryland
Gothic Revival church buildings in Maryland
Victorian architecture in Maryland
Churches in Dorchester County, Maryland
Methodist churches in Maryland
National Register of Historic Places in Dorchester County, Maryland
1857 establishments in Maryland
Taylors Island, Maryland
Methodist Episcopal churches in the United States